Again and Again is an album by the American jazz saxophonist Oliver Lake. It was recorded in 1991 and released on the Gramavision label. Lake composed eight ballads for a quartet with pianist John Hicks, bassist Reggie Workman and drummer Pheeroan akLaff.

Reception

The Washington Post wrote that "the album finds Lake in a mood of almost unbroken reflection, playing with a tart, yearning tone over the shimmering and often harmonically ambiguous backdrops."

In his review for AllMusic, Scott Yanow states: "Although none of these originals are destined to become standards, they inspire Lake to come up with some of his more lyrical solos." The Penguin Guide to Jazz notes: "Again and Again offers an uncommonly lyrical and mainstream performance from Lake. Only 'Aztec' and 'Re-cre-ate' approach the angularity one normally expects of his soloing."

Track listing
All compositions by Oliver Lake
 "Again and Again" – 7:15
 "Anyway" – 7:17
 "Cross River" – 4:13
 "Touch" – 8:27
 "Aztec" – 6:00
 "Mask" – 8:04
 "Re-cre-ate" – 4:25
 "M.I.L.D." – 7:15

Personnel
Oliver Lake - alto sax, soprano sax
John Hicks – piano
Reggie Workman – bass
Pheeroan akLaff – drums

References

Oliver Lake albums
1991 albums
Gramavision Records albums